Walta TV is an Ethiopian television network owned and operated by Walta Media and Communication Corporate S.C.
Walta TV is available on three satellites, originally on Eutelsat 7 West A but also on Belintersat 1 and on the Ethiosat platform.

History
Walta TV was launched on April 7, 2017. As of 2017, it was one of five channels in Ethiopia to be officially licensed by the Ethiopian Broadcasting Authority. Before the launch of its own channel, Walta mostly provided its locally produced news and documentaries for the national broadcaster EBC (formerly ETV). It is also one of the few private channels to be available on the Ethiopia-based satellite platform Ethiosat to be found on Eutelsat 8 West B.

Programming 
Walta TV has essentially the same format as EBC as programming is mostly geared towards news focusing on political and social issues within Ethiopia.

References 

Television channels in Ethiopia
Mass media in Addis Ababa
Television channels and stations established in 2017
24-hour television news channels
Satellite television